Karl Temata (born 12 July 1978) is a former Cook Islands international rugby league footballer who played as a  or er in the 2000s and 2010s. He played at club level for the Hibiscus Coast Raiders, New Zealand Warriors, London Broncos/Harlequins and Oxford.

Background
Temata was born in Whangārei, New Zealand. He is of Māori and Cook Islands descent.

Playing career
Temata played for the Harlequins RL in the Super League. He previously played for the New Zealand Warriors and the Hibiscus Coast Raiders. He was named the Harlequins RL player of the year in 2009.

In 2011 Temata signed a one-year extension with Harlequins RL for the 2012 season.

Representative career
Temata played for the Cook Islands in the 2000 Rugby League World Cup, and scored a try in the Cook Islands' 38-6 defeat by Wales in Wrexham. In September 2011 he was named in the Cook Islands squad to play New Zealand in Rarotonga on 6 October 2011 ahead of New Zealand's participation in the 2011 Four Nations in England, and Wales.

References

External links

Statistics at rugbyleagueproject.org
Quins RL profile
Temata SL stats

1978 births
Living people
Cook Islands national rugby league team players
Hibiscus Coast Raiders players
London Broncos players
New Zealand sportspeople of Cook Island descent
New Zealand rugby league players
New Zealand Warriors players
Oxford Rugby League players
Rugby league locks
Rugby league players from Northland Region
Rugby league props
Rugby league second-rows
Rugby league wingers
Sportspeople from Whangārei